Samburu is a Maa language dialect spoken by Samburu pastoralists in northern Kenya. The Samburu number about 128,000 (or 147,000 including the Camus/Chamus). The Samburu dialect is closely related to Camus dialect (88% to 94% lexical similarity) and to the South Maasai dialects (77% to 89% lexical similarity). The word "Samburu" itself may derive from the Maa word saamburr for a leather bag the Samburu use.

References

Further reading 
 Rainer Vossen.  The Eastern Nilotes: Linguistic and Historical Reconstructions.  Berlin: Dietrich Reimer Verlag 1982.  .

External links
Maa Language Project
Embuku E Sayiata Too Ltung'ana Pooki Maasai-Samburu Anglican Prayer Book (1967), digitized by Richard Mammana

Languages of Kenya
Maa languages